New Holland is a historical European name for mainland Australia. 

The name was first applied to Australia in 1644 by the Dutch seafarer Abel Tasman. The name came for a time to be applied in most European maps to the vaunted "Southern land" or Terra Australis even after its coastline was finally explored.  

The continent of Antarctica, later named in the 1890s, was still in largely speculative form; it resumed the name Terra Australis (sometimes suffixed Non Cognita, unknown). Its existence had been speculated on in some maps since the 5th century, under the theory of "balancing hemispheres". 

Lieutenant James Cook, captain of HMS Endeavour, claimed the eastern portion of the Australian continent for the British Crown in 1770, naming it New South Wales. The British settlement of Sydney as a colony in 1788 prompted Britain to formally claim the east coast as New South Wales, leading to a search for a new collective name. New Holland was never settled by the Dutch people, whose colonial forces and buoyant population had a settled preference for the Dutch Cape Colony, Dutch Guyana, the Dutch East Indies, Dutch Ceylon and the Dutch West Indies. 

New Holland continued to be used semi-officially and in popular usage as the name for the whole land mass until at least the mid-1850s.

History

During the Golden Age of Dutch exploration and discovery (c. 1590s–1720s)

The name New Holland was first applied to the western and northern coast of Australia in 1644 by the Dutch seafarer Abel Tasman, best known for his discovery of Tasmania (called by him Van Diemen's Land). The English Captain William Dampier used the name in his account of his two voyages there: the first arriving on 5 January 1688 and staying until 12 March; his second voyage of exploration to the region was made in 1699. Except for giving its name to the land, neither the Netherlands nor the Dutch East India Company claimed any territory in Australia as its own. Although many Dutch expeditions visited the coast during the 200 years after the first Dutch visit in 1606, there was no lasting attempt at establishment of a permanent settlement. Most of the explorers of this period concluded that the apparent lack of water and fertile soil made the region unsuitable for colonisation.

After the Dutch era

On 22 August 1770, after sailing north along Australia's east coast, James Cook claimed the entire "Eastern coast of New Holland" that he had just explored as British territory. Cook first named the land New Wales, but revised it to New South Wales. With the establishment of a settlement at Sydney in 1788, the British solidified its claim to the eastern part of Australia, now officially called New South Wales. In the commission to Governor Phillip the boundary was defined as the 135th meridian east longitude (135° east) (map from 25 April 1787), taking the line from Melchisédech Thévenot's chart, Hollandia Nova—Terre Australe, published in Relations de Divers Voyages Curieux (Paris, 1663).

The term New Holland was more often used to refer only to that part of the continent that had not yet been annexed to New South Wales; namely it referred to the western half of the continent. In 1804, the British navigator Matthew Flinders proposed the names Terra Australis or Australia for the whole continent, reserving "New Holland" for the western part of the continent. He continued to use Australia in his correspondence, while attempting to gather support for the term. Flinders explained in a letter to Sir Joseph Banks:
The propriety of the name Australia or Terra Australis, which I have applied to the whole body of what has generally been called New Holland, must be submitted to the approbation of the Admiralty and the learned in geography. It seems to me an inconsistent thing that captain Cooks New South Wales should be absorbed in the New Holland of the Dutch, and therefore I have reverted to the original name Terra Australis or the Great South Land, by which it was distinguished even by the Dutch during the 17th century; for it appears that it was not until some time after Tasman's second voyage that the name New Holland was first applied, and then it was long before it displaced T’Zuydt Landt in the charts, and could not extend to what was not yet known to have existence; New South Wales, therefore, ought to remain distinct from New Holland; but as it is requisite that the whole body should have one general name, since it is now known (if there is no great error in the Dutch part) that it is certainly all one land, so I judge, that one less exceptionable to all parties and on all accounts cannot be found than that now applied.

His suggestion was initially rejected, but the new name was approved by the British government in 1824. The western boundary of New South Wales was changed to 129° east in 1825 (16 July 1825 – map). In 1826, to pre-empt a French settlement and claim to the territory, because of the importance of the route to New South Wales the British established the settlement of Albany in south-west New Holland. Governor Ralph Darling of New South Wales put Edmund Lockyer in command of the expedition and gave him the order that if he encountered the French anywhere he was to land troops, to signify to them that "the whole of New Holland is subject to His Britannic Majesty's Government." In 1828 a further settlement was made, this time on the Swan River, and the name Swan River Colony was soon the term used to refer to the whole western part of the continent. The name New Holland was still invoked as the name for the whole continent when Charles Fremantle on 9 May 1829 took formal possession in the name of King George IV of "all that part of New Holland which is not included within the territory of New South Wales." In 1832, the territory was officially renamed Western Australia.

Even as late as 1837, in official correspondence between the British government in London and New South Wales, the term "New Holland" was still being used to refer to the continent as a whole.

In the Netherlands, the continent continued to be called Nieuw Holland until about the end of the 19th century. The Dutch name today is Australië.

One place where the name persists is in taxonomy. Many Australian species named in previous centuries have the specific name novaehollandiae or novae-hollandiae, for example the emu, Dromaius novaehollandiae.

Change of name 

After British colonisation, the name New Holland was retained for several decades and the south polar continent continued to be called Terra Australis, sometimes shortened to Australia. However, in the 19th century, the colonial authorities gradually removed the Dutch name from the island continent and, instead of inventing a new name, they took the name Australia from the south polar continent, leaving a lacuna in continental nomenclature for eighty years. Even so, the name New Holland survived for many decades, used in atlases, literature and in common parlance.

In literature

Description
Dutch politician and cartographer Nicolaes Witsen describes the south West Australian coast in a detailed description in a letter titled ‘Some late observations of New Holland’ written to English naturalist Dr Martin Lister, dated from 3 October 1698:
On this Voyage nothing hath been discovered which can be any way serviceable to the Company. The Soil of this Country hath been found very barren, and as a Desart; no Fresh-water Rivers have been found, but some Salt-water Rivers, as also no Fourfooted Beasts, except one as great as a Dog, with long Ears, living in the Water as well as on the Land.

Black Swans, Parrots, and many Sea-Cows were found there; as also a Lake, whose Water seemed to be Red, because of the Redness of the Bottom of it: and round along the Shore there was some Salt. Our People had seen but Twelve of the Natives, all as black as Pitch, and stark naked, so terrified, that it was impossible to bring them to Conversation, or a Meeting: They lodge themselves as the Hottentots, in Pavilions of Small Branches of Trees. By Night our People saw Fires all over the Country; but when they drew near, the Natives were fled. The Coast is very low, but the Country far from the Sea is high.

Upon the Island near the coast have been seen Rats as great as Cats, in an innumerable Quantity; all which had a kind of Bag or Purse hanging from the Throat upon the Brest downwards. There were found many well-smelling Trees, and out of their Wood is to be drawn Oyl smelling as a Rose, but for the rest they were small and miserable Trees. There were also found some Birds nests of prodigious greatness, so that Six Men could not, by stretching out their Arms, encompass One of them; but the Fowls were not to be found.

There was great Store of Oysters, Lobsters, and Crabs; and also strange sorts of Fish. There were also Millions of Flies, very much troubling Men. They saw a great many Footsteps of Men and Children, but all of an ordinary bigness. The Coast is very foul and full of Rocks.

Other literature

In Gulliver's Travels (1726) by Jonathan Swift, the title character, travelling from Houyhnhnms Land, spends a few days on the southeast coast of New Holland before he is chased away by the natives.

The American author Edgar Allan Poe used the name New Holland to refer to Australia in his prize-winning 1833 short story "MS. Found in a Bottle":

In 1851, Herman Melville wrote, in a chapter of his novel Moby-Dick entitled "Does the Whale's Magnitude Diminish? – Will He Perish?":

In 1854, another American writer, Henry David Thoreau, used the term New Holland (referring to the territory of the "wild" indigenous Australians) in his book Walden; or, Life in the Woods, in which he writes:

See also

 History of Western Australia
 Terra Australis
 European exploration of Australia

References

European exploration of Australia
History of Australia (1788–1850)
Exploration of Western Australia
English exonyms
Archaic English words and phrases
Names of places in Australia
Maritime history of the Dutch East India Company
Dutch exploration in the Age of Discovery
17th century in the Dutch Empire
18th century in the Dutch Empire
17th century in Oceania
18th century in Oceania
Early modern Netherlandish cartography
Dutch-Australian culture